Eileen Bell is a former Irish lawn and indoor bowler born in 1936.

Bowls career
Bell started bowling in the sixties in her home town of Ballynahinch, Northern Ireland. Bell won the 1981 World Outdoor Bowls Championship pairs Gold in Toronto when partnering Nan Allely. She bowled for the Belfast BC (outdoors) and Shaws Bridge (indoors).

Bell is the winner of nine Irish National Bowls Championships and has been three times British Isles Bowls Championships singles title holder (1974, 1983 & 1986), a record only bettered by fellow Irish bowler Margaret Johnston. In addition she has also won a triples and fours title.

References

Female lawn bowls players from Northern Ireland
1936 births
Living people
Bowls World Champions